This is a list of World War II weapons of Hungary. Hungary mainly fought in World War II as part of the Axis forces on the Eastern Front but also took part in the Axis Invasion of Yugoslavia. In March 1944 Germany occupied Hungary and put in a puppet government after Hungary had been secretly negotiating a peace settlement with the United States  and United Kingdom. Note that some Russian weapons would have been used by Hungary after they were captured during Operation Barbarossa.

Small arms

Rifles 

 35M rifle

Sidearms 

 FÉG 37M Pistol-Main service pistol
 Roth–Steyr M1907

Machine guns 

 MG 30
 Schwarzlose machine gun

Anti-tank rifles 

 Solothurn S-18/100

Artillery

Anti-tank guns 

 3.7 cm Pak 36
 7.5 cm Pak 40

Armoured fighting vehicles(AFV's)

Light Tanks 
38M Toldi

Panzer 38(t)

Medium tanks 

 40M Turán
 Panzer III
 Panzer IV

Heavy tanks 

 Tiger I

Tank destroyer 

 43M Zrínyi

Tankettes 

 L3/33
 L3/35

References

Weapons of Hungary
Military history of Hungary during World War II